The 2011–12 Burkinabé Premier League is the 50th edition of top flight football in Burkina Faso. A total of twenty teams competed in the season.

Teams
Sources:

Group A
ASFA
AS Kouritenga
Canon du Sud
Étoile Filante
Kadiogo
Sanmatenga FC
Santos
SONABEL
USFA
Ouagadougou

Group B
ASEC Koudougou
ASFB
AS Maya
Bobo Sport
Bouloumpoukou FC
Comoé
RC Bobo Dioulasso
US FRAN
Yatenga
Sourou Sport de Tougan

First stage
Sources:

Group A

Group B

Super division

Table

References

Premier League
Premier League
Burkina Faso
Burkinabé Premier League seasons